Bulgarica cana is a species of air-breathing land snail, a terrestrial pulmonate gastropod mollusk in the family Clausiliidae, the door snails.

Distribution 
This species occurs in:
 Czech Republic
 Poland
 Slovakia
 Ukraine
 Latvia

References

Further reading 
Magdalena Marzec. 2006. Mobility of Bulgarica cana in a natural habitat. The Malacologist, Molluscan Forum 2006.

Clausiliidae
Gastropods described in 1836